Pyrota insulata, sometimes known by the common name yellow-crescent blister beetle, is a blister beetle, so called because if squeezed, it can produce an irritant called cantharidin that causes a blister on exposed human skin.

Distribution
Pyrota insulata is found in the USA (mainly in Texas, Arizona and Wyoming) and Mexico.

Description
Pyrota insulata grows to a size of about 2 cm.

References

External links
 http://texasento.net
 http://bugguide.net
 http://bugguide.net
 http://greglasley.com

Meloidae
Beetles described in 1858